Skinner's is a British brewery founded in 1997 by Steve Skinner in Truro, Cornwall, England.

The company produces cask ales and bottled beers, the names of which often come from Cornish folklore. Several ales have a connection to surfing culture, such as Skin Dog Cornish lager, which is named after the owner's son, Ben "Skindog" Skinner who is a surfer. Several beers have won Campaign for Real Ale (CAMRA) and SIBA awards. The company's pub, the Skinner's Ale House in Newquay, was sold, and is now called Leadbelly's. Skinners' new pub, The Old Ale House in Truro, serves their own ales, regular guest beers and ciders. 

In 2010–11, the company closed two of its sites at Chacewater and Devoran after purchasing a  site next to its headquarters for storage and distribution.

On 30 September 2022, the company announced via social media that it would enter administration from 3 October 2022.

Beers
Skinner's Brewery cask ale range includes:

Skinner's range of seasonal ales include:

Past seasonal and speciality ales include:

 Poppy Ale (4.2%)
 Mousehole Moonshine (4.3%)
 Pint of Two-Halves (4.6%)
 Riggin' Ale (4.5%)
 Royal Wave (4.4%)
 Sennen (3.8%)
 New Year's Resolution (5.5%)

See also
 List of breweries in England

References

Companies based in Cornwall
Cornish cuisine
Breweries in England
British companies established in 1997
Food and drink companies established in 1997
1997 establishments in England
Truro